Rebecca Marie Stirm (born February 9, 1993) is an internationally renowned fashion designer from Belize. In 2012, she represented Belize in the prestigious "Mission Catwalk" which features top designers from around the Caribbean. She designs women's wear and handbags using locally sourced materials under the signature brand of "Twig and Pearl", formerly "Rebecca Stirm Clothing".

Early life and education

Rebecca Stirm began drawing, painting, playing music, and sewing at an early age. As
she grew, Rebecca begun to lean more towards design, and her sketches slowly drifted
away from portraits and landscapes -- beginning to focus more on figure drawing, and
garment sketches. She began designing clothing for herself, until her senior year of
highschool when Rebecca was encouraged by a close friend to actually hold her first
fashion show. After graduating high school, Rebecca created her first collection of day
dresses and cocktail dresses, held her first runway show, and received her first orders
for dresses from her collection

Achievements and works
After her first successful collection Rebecca realized her love for designing
clothes, could actually become a viable business. She continued designing pieces, and
showcased a second collection before re-locating to Vancouver in June 2011 for a
semester in fashion design, construction, and marketing at the Art Institute of
Vancouver. Shortly after returning to Belize, she was accepted to represent Belize,
competing in Mission Catwalk (Caribbean designer reality TV show) against 19 other
Caribbean designers – for a chance to “Rule the Catwalk.” She won the most
challenges (4 out of 12) and came out at the end of the season as second runner up.
On her return to Belize, Rebecca launched her business, designing and constructing
custom occasion-wear. Rebecca was ready to carve her niche in the fashion world.

Rebecca continued showcasing her work locally and ended up going back to Jamaica in 2013 to showcase her "Pfuma Ye Nyika" collection on the runway at the Wyndham Wedding Spectacular.

In 2014, Rebecca flew to London to represent Belize at the Splendours of the Common Wealth charity event to raise money for the CCLEF charity foundation. 

After three years of designing custom gowns and collections, receiving a grant to invest
in heavy duty machinery, and investing countless hours and marketing in her brand,
Rebecca realized that she no-longer believed in the business that she was building. Her
Belief in the need for sustainable business development, a lessened environmental
impact of fashion production, and her current design process and production methods,
just weren't lining up. “ I realized that by designing custom occasion wear, that women
would wear once, and then either away in an already-full closet, never to be seen again,
I was contributing to the problem : landfills full of polyester clothing that have only been
worn once, and are being basically thrown away afterwards”. She realized that this was
NOT the business she wanted to be in, closed down Rebecca Stirm Clothing, and took
a season off to re-think and reassess her direction.

TWIG & PEARL 

While in her season of re-thinking, she began to source local food bi-product leather, construct test-versions of handbags for herself, and research on sustainable business practices, recycling, and sustainable production for fashion goods. From her love for
natural materials, respect for artisan skillsets, and need for the products she designed
to have a minimal environmental impact, the concept of TWIG & PEARL was born. “I
started TWIG & PEARL with two goals in mind. 1.) all our products would be designed
and made from a minimum of 75% natural materials and 2.) we would integrate the use
of artisan skillsets into the design of our pieces, to help not only preserve these unique
skillsets, but also to bring continuous work to local artisans.”
In the fall of 2015, she launched her first line of minimally designed leather handbags.
The bags begun to sell successfully, and a year and a half later she would launch her
e-commerce site -- twigandpearl.com. Since then, she has released new collections of
handbags, and launched a small line of natural-fiber clothing under her own name. She
has incorporated beading, recycled bamboo, exotic hardwoods, and hand-printed
fabrics into her collections, and in the fall of 2017, she launched a mini-collection of
handbags in collaboration with OCEANA Belize, designed to bring awareness to the
endangered Hawksbill Turtle.
Rebecca continues to design and produce food-bi-product leather handbags and chic
natural fiber clothing, as well as plan new ways for TWIG & PEARL to innovatively bring
a positive environmental and economical impact to her Belize… all from her little home
studio in Roaring Creek.

References

External links
http://twigandpearl.com

Living people
1993 births
Belizean fashion designers
Belizean women fashion designers